Phospholemman (PLM) is a protein that in humans is encoded by the FXYD1 gene.

This gene encodes a member of a family of small membrane proteins that share a 35-amino acid signature sequence domain, beginning with the sequence PFXYD and containing 7 invariant and 6 highly conserved amino acids. The approved human gene nomenclature for the family is FXYD-domain containing ion transport regulator. Mouse FXYD5 has been termed RIC (Related to Ion Channel). FXYD2, also known as the gamma subunit of the Na,K-ATPase, regulates the properties of that enzyme. FXYD1 (phospholemman), FXYD2 (gamma), FXYD3 (MAT-8), FXYD4 (CHIF), and FXYD5 (RIC) have been shown to induce channel activity in experimental expression systems. Transmembrane topology has been established for two family members (FXYD1 and FXYD2), with the N-terminus extracellular and the C-terminus on the cytoplasmic side of the membrane. The protein encoded by this gene is a plasma membrane substrate for several kinases, including protein kinase A, protein kinase C, NIMA kinase, and myotonic dystrophy kinase. It is thought to form an ion channel or regulate ion channel activity. Transcript variants with different 5' UTR sequences have been described in the literature.

References

Further reading